Three ships of the Royal Navy have been named HMS Arbutus:

   was a modified Flower-class corvette, launched on 26 January 1944, and loaned to the Royal New Zealand Navy. Decommissioned in 1948, she was returned to the Royal Navy and broken up in June 1951. 
 

Royal Navy ship names